Dalip Thakur is an Indian politician. He is Member of the Himachal Pradesh Legislative Assembly from the Sarkaghat Assembly constituency. He is serving since December 8, 2022. He is a Member of the Bharatiya Janata Party.

References 

Living people
Himachal Pradesh MLAs 2022–2027
Bharatiya Janata Party politicians from Himachal Pradesh
Year of birth missing (living people)